USNS Tippecanoe (T-AO-199) is a Henry J. Kaiser-class underway replenishment oiler operated by the Military Sealift Command (MSC) to support ships of the United States Navy.  She serves in the United States Pacific Fleet. Tippecanoe, the thirteenth ship of the Henry J. Kaiser class, was laid down at Avondale Shipyard, Inc., at New Orleans, Louisiana, on 19 November 1990 and launched on 16 May 1992. She entered non-commissioned U.S. Navy service under the control of the MSC with a primarily civilian crew on 8 February 1993.

Tippecanoe was deployed to East Timor as part of the Australian-led INTERFET peacekeeping taskforce from 16 to 24 October 1999.  In January 2005, Tippecanoe was part of the American relief effort in response to the Indian Ocean tsunami of 26 December 2004.

Design
The Henry J. Kaiser-class replenishment oilers were preceded by the shorter Cimarron-class replenishment oilers.

They were built without armaments but can be fitted with close-in weapon systems. The ship has a helicopter platform but not any maintenance facilities. It has a complement of eighty-nine civilians (nineteen officers), twenty-nine spare crew, and six United States Navy crew.

Photos

References

Oiler Tippecanoe Pumps Aid Into Tsunami Relief Efforts

External links

 NavSource Online: Service Ship Photo Archive: USNS Tippecanoe (T-AO-199)
 USNS Tippecanoe (T-AO 199)

 

Henry J. Kaiser-class oilers
Ships built in Bridge City, Louisiana
1992 ships